Interstate 280 (I-280) is a  auxiliary Interstate Highway in Ohio that connects I-75 in northeast Toledo with I-80/I-90 (part of the Ohio Turnpike) southeast of the city in northeastern Wood County. Built between 1955 and 1959, the route was originally part of the Detroit–Toledo Expressway. Although first designated in 1959, the highway originally contained several at-grade intersections and other features which left it substandard to the Interstate Highway System until 1990. Further construction in 2007 built a new crossing of the Maumee River, replacing an outdated drawbridge. The highway serves as an easterly bypass of the Toledo metropolitan area, passing through the communities of Northwood and Oregon. It is one of two auxiliary Interstate Highways serving Toledo, the other being I-475.

Route description

The southern end of I-280 is an interchange in Wood County with exit  71 along the Ohio Turnpike, which carries I-80 and I-90 at this point. South of this interchange, the I-280 freeway transitions to State Route 420 (SR 420), a divided highway without access control, that also provides access to a truck stop and other businesses. Continuing north, I-280 runs through farmland and through an interchange with Bahnsen Road, which also provides access to other motorist- and trucking-related businesses and access to Latcha and Hanley roads. North of the SR 795 interchange, the freeway turns to the northwest. At the Walbridge Road interchange in Walbridge, I-280 turns back due north. On either side of the Interstate, the surroundings transition from farms to residential subdivisions. I-280 crosses a major Norfolk Southern Railway railroad line also used by the Capitol Limited and Lake Shore Limited passenger train routes operated by Amtrak. North of this crossing, the freeway passes into Lucas County. I-280 turns northwesterly again in the city of Oregon. This area is suburban residential neighborhoods as the freeway approaches the Maumee River. On the opposite bank of the river, I-280 turns northward and passes through an intersection with SR 25. There is one final interchange with I-75 where I-280 terminates.

History
The highway that would eventually carry I-280, the Detroit–Toledo Expressway, opened as a relocated SR 120 between US Route 20 (US 20) and SR 51 by 1955. The highway was extended to Summit Street in Toledo by 1957 and, by 1959, was extended into Michigan. By this time, the I-280 designation had been added, but the portion carrying I-280 was not fully converted to Interstate standards until 1990.

Initially, the freeway had several at-grade intersections with crossroads: Hanley and Latcha roads near Perrysburg; Ayers, Lemoyne, and Walbridge roads near Walbridge; and Curtice Road in Northwood. The Walbridge intersection was later upgraded to a traffic signal, one of the few on the Interstate Highway System at the time, while the intersection underwent study for conversion to an interchange. Hanley and Latcha roads were truncated to dead-end just before the freeway, but access to both roads was retained by construction of a new interchange and service drives in the early 1970s; the Ayers and Lemoyne crossings were also upgraded to overpasses at this point. The removal of direct access to Hanley and Latcha was originally disputed by business owners who owned motels and gas stations along those roads. The crossing at Curtice Road was upgraded to an interchange concurrently with the upgrade of the nearby interchange with Woodville Road.

Originally, I-280 was carried across the Maumee River by the Robert Craig Memorial Bridge, a drawbridge that frequently caused backups along the route. In addition, a ramp leading from northbound Summit Street to southbound I-280 merged directly onto the bridge with no acceleration room, so it was removed in the mid-1990s. On June 24, 2007, the Veterans' Glass City Skyway opened, replacing the drawbridge. After the Glass City Skyway opened, the Craig Bridge was reconstructed, and it now carries SR 65. Its construction also led to the reconstruction of the Front Street exit and removal of the Summit Street interchange entirely; access from I-280 to Summit Street is now provided by the Front Street exit and the Craig Bridge.

Exit list

References

External links

 Interstate 280 at Ohio Highway Ends

80-2 Ohio
80-2
2 Ohio
Transportation in Wood County, Ohio
Transportation in Lucas County, Ohio